A.E. Vickery was a wooden three-masted schooner built in 1861 and measured 136.2 ft. x 26.2 ft. x 10.8 ft. The ship was launched in July 1861 at Three Mile Bay, New York, United States as J. B. Penfield, and under that name sailed through the Welland Canal on her way from Detroit, Michigan, to Oswego, New York. She was renamed A. E. Vickery on 25 February 1884 and sank on 17 August 1889 when she struck a shoal while entering the American Narrows with a cargo of 21,000 bushels of corn destined for Wisers Distillery at Prescott, Ontario, Canada. The wreck now rests at a depth of about  near Rock Island Light at position .

See also
 Shipwreck
 Thousand Islands
 Alexandria Bay, New York

References

External links
 Divetech
 Dive1000Islands.com

Schooners of the United States
1861 ships
Ships built in New York (state)
Shipwrecks of the Saint Lawrence River
Maritime incidents in August 1889